Glandulocaudinae are a subfamily of tropical freshwater characin fish from Central and South America. In all species of this subfamily, a gland on their caudal fin is found almost exclusively in the males, which allows the release and pumping of pheromones; also, members of this subfamily have complex courtship behaviors which lead to insemination. The ecology and life history of these fish is complex yet little studied. Glandulocaudines are important as food fish for larger fish important for commercial and subsistence reasons.

Taxonomy
Glandulocaudinae consists of twenty genera divided among seven monophyletic, morphologically differing tribes. The monophyly of the subfamily itself needs much further investigation. There are about 60 species. However, there remain many undescribed species.

Distribution and habitat
Glandulocaudines occur in practically all major South American drainages. Along Pacific drainages, they are distributed from Costa Rica to Ecuador, and along Atlantic drainages, their range extends to northern Argentina. These fishes are found in every South American country, including Trinidad and excluding Chile; they inhabit streams that are tributaries to larger rivers such as the Amazon, Orinoco, and Paraguay Rivers in tropical species, or coastal streams tributary to the Atlantic and Pacific Oceans and the Caribbean Sea in the few subtropical species.

The habitats of these fish vary. Some species are confined to acidic black rainforest waters, and others are found in clearer, neutral to somewhat alkaline waters; a few species are even adapted to both kinds of waters. However, there are no brackish water species.

Characteristics
Glandulocaudines are small, less than 13 centimetres (5 in). The reproductive adaptations of glandulocaudines is what sets this group apart from the other Characins. Males have a caudal organ associated with gland tissues. Synapomorphies of this subfamily include insemination, a posterior sperm storage area in the testes, and an elongate sperm nucleus.

All males have some form of modified caudal gland used to release pheromones as part of courtship. The structure of this gland depends on the specific tribe; the organ may consist of modified caudal fin rays; modified caudal fin scales, a derived hypural fan, or modified caudal fin musculature, or combinations of the above. Modified scales may act as bellows in releasing chemicals into the water. A caudal fin ray pheromone pump, unique to tribe Glandulocaudini, consists of glandular tissue associated with modified scales and fin rays. The tribe Diapomini is the only tribe in which the caudal gland is equally developed in both the males and females.

Females of all glandulocaudine species are inseminated. The females produce fewer eggs per unit body weight than externally fertilizing species; this is possibly because insemination increases the efficiency of fertilization, so fewer eggs are necessary. This insemination is preceded by courtship in all species. After insemination, the female may retain the live sperm for many months in her ovaries. This allows the eggs to be laid when environmental conditions are favorable. However, there is no evidence of an intromittent organ, and the exact mechanism of insemination is unknown. Hooks on the anal fin of males may play a role, although these are also found in characins that exhibit external fertilization. It was originally believed that internal fertilization occurs in glandulocaudines. However, the exact time of fertilization is unknown and no fertilized eggs are found internally; this suggests fertilization occurs when the eggs are being laid or even outside of the body.

Due to insemination, the sperm of glandulocaudines has adapted. In many species, an elongate cytoplasmic collar binds the flagellum to the elongate nucleus at some stage of spermiogenesis. In almost all species, the sperm cell bodies are elongate. In the tribe Diapomini, the genus Planaltina expresses only round sperm (like that of externally fertilizing characins) and the genera Diapoma and Acrobrycon only express slightly elongated sperm; this may indicate a possible plesiomorphy. Some sperm have enlarged regions containing mitochondria, which may help in prolonging the life of the sperm while stored in the ovary. In some genera, sperm clumping and patterns of arrangement are observed in the sperm ducts and storage regions. In the tribes Xenobryconini (in the genera Tyttocharax, Scopaeocharax, and Xenurobrycon) and Glandulocaudini, there is a form of sperm packaging which would allow for a higher sperm density during transfer from the male to the female. These packets are called spermatozeugmata, and the sperm are packaged parallel to each other; this packaging is further increased by the elongation of the sperm cells. In Xenobryconini, each spermatozeugma is produced and is released fully formed in the spermatocysts, but in Glandulocaudini, the sperm is released from the spermatocysts and packaged elsewhere. The spermatozeugmata are situated in the posterior end of the testes, which serves as a storage area for sperm.

Many of the genera also have a gland situated in the gill cavity called a "gill gland", a secondary sex characteristic found in sexually mature male glandulocaudines that is apparently suited to release chemical signals. No genus contains species that have glands and other species without glands. This gill gland is derived from anterior gill filaments of the first gill arch. Gland size and degree of gill modification varies with species. Though the true function of the gill glands has yet to be determined, they are probably used to release chemical signals into the gill current.

There are many examples of sexual dimorphism (differences in appearance between the genders). In Corynopoma riisei, the males have extended finnage (giving it the common name "swordtailed characin") as well as paddle-like extensions of the operculum. Many other species also have other secondary sex characteristics believed to be involved in courtship.

Many of these characteristics are also shared with the tribe Compsurini in Cheirodontinae. Though unrelated, this group contains inseminating species with caudal organs. However, the caudal organs and other similar characteristics are structured differently. They also share the elongate cytoplasmic collar binding the flagellum to the elongate nucleus at some stage of spermiogenesis, which was previously assumed to be exclusive to glandulocaudines. These fish also occasionally have gill glands.

Courtship
Like other ostariophysans, glandulocaudines show a reaction to chemical signals in the water. Many ostariophysans have a fright reaction in response to an alarm substance. In Corynopoma riisei, it has been shown that a sexually mature male's presence actually inhibits the maturation of immature males. In C. riisei, the female is often situated parallel to and somewhat behind the male, which allows for chemical signals released from the male's gill glands to be carried directly to the female.

Glandulocaudines have complex courtship behavior. In C. riisei, the male has paddle-shaped extensions of the operculum which can be extended perpendicular to its body and twitches and flutters due to movements of his body; the female follows and nips at these projections during courtship.

A croaking behavior is recorded in some species of Mimagoniates. This behavior has a part in courtship as well. Courtship involves the male chasing and hovering near the female. As the male hovers, he will quickly swim to the surface and take a gulp of air and return, expelling the gas and making continuous, rhythmic pulses of croaking sounds, interrupted only by the male returning to the surface for more air. The fish also zigzags while hovering by swimming up and down, when the fish intends to resurface but does not. Croaking behavior may have evolved from a behavior called "nipping surface", a feeding behavior that occurs when the fish is searching for food; the fish often will gulp air when doing this. This gulping of air has no respiratory significance.

In the aquarium
Some species of Glandulocaudinae are important in the aquarium trade. Herbert R. Axelrod has discussed the care of a number of species, including Corynopoma riisei, Gephyrocharax caucanus, Mimagoniates microlepis, M. lateralis, M. inequalis, Pseudocorynopoma doriae, and Tyttocharax madeirae. These species reach about 5–6 cm (about 2 in). However, T. madeirae reaches 2 cm (less than 1 in), while P. doriae reaches . Like most tetras, they prefer to swim in schools; some species may be nippy, and should be kept in groups to divide aggression. Many species are very active and will almost constantly swim, which translates to a larger aquarium. They have been bred in captivity.

These fish may not be as easily weaned onto dry foods as other fish, and will appreciate live foods. Some species appreciate cooler water than the average tropical fish, so this should be kept in mind when maintaining some of these species. Also, many imported specimens, even if they seem healthy, may mysteriously waste away. Some species are delicate and are not easily collected or transported, or are rarely seen available.

Species
Species list is according to FishBase. ITIS does not list Characin subfamilies as they believe subfamilies are likely to change.

Tribe Landonini
Landonia
Landonia latidens  Eigenmann & Henn, 1914
Tribe Glandulocaudini
Glandulocauda
Glandulocauda melanogenys  Eigenmann, 1911
Glandulocauda melanopleura  Eigenmann, 1911
Lophiobrycon
Lophiobrycon weitzmani  Castro, Ribeira, Benine & Melo, 2003
Mimagoniates
Mimagoniates barberi  Regan, 1907
Mimagoniates inequalis (Eigenmann, 1911)
Mimagoniates lateralis  (Nichols, 1913)
Mimagoniates microlepis  (Steindachner, 1876)
Mimagoniates rheocharis  Menezes & Weitzman, 1990
Mimagoniates sylvicola Menezes & Weitzman, 1990
Tribe Diapomini
Acrobrycon
Acrobrycon ipanquianus  (Cope, 1877)
Acrobrycon tarijae  Fowler, 1940
Diapoma
Diapoma speculiferum  Cope, 1894
Diapoma terofoli  (Géry, 1964)
Planaltina
Planaltina britskii  Menezes, Weitzman & Burns, 2003
Planaltina glandipedis  Menezes, Weitzman & Burns, 2003
Planaltina myersi  Böhlke, 1954
Tribe Phenacobryconini
Phenacobrycon
Phenacobrycon henni  (Eigenmann, 1914)
Tribe Hysteronotini
Hysteronotus
Hysteronotus megalostomus  Eigenmann, 1922
Pseudocorynopoma
Pseudocorynopoma doriai  Perugia, 1891 
Pseudocorynopoma heterandria  Eigenmann, 1914
Tribe Corynopomini
Corynopoma
Corynopoma riisei  Gill, 1858
Gephyrocharax
Gephyrocharax atracaudatus  (Meek & Hildebrand, 1912)
Gephyrocharax caucanus Eigenmann, 1912
Gephyrocharax chaparae  Fowler, 1940
Gephyrocharax chocoensis  Eigenmann, 1912
Gephyrocharax intermedius  Meek & Hildebrand, 1916
Gephyrocharax major  Myers, 1929
Gephyrocharax martae  Dahl, 1943
Gephyrocharax melanocheir  Eigenmann, 1912
Gephyrocharax sinuensis  Dahl, 1964
Gephyrocharax valencia  Eigenmann, 1920
Gephyrocharax venezuelae  Schultz, 1944
Gephyrocharax whaleri  Hildebrand, 1938
Pterobrycon
Pterobrycon landoni  Eigenmann, 1913
Pterobrycon myrnae  Bussing, 1974
Tribe Xenurobryconini
Argopleura
Argopleura chocoensis  (Eigenmann, 1913)
Argopleura conventus  (Eigenmann, 1913)
Argopleura diquensis  (Eigenmann, 1913)
Argopleura magdalenensis  (Eigenmann, 1913
Chrysobrycon
Chrysobrycon hesperus  (Böhlke, 1958)
Chrysobrycon myersi  (Weitzman & Thomerson, 1970)
Iotabrycon
Iotabrycon praecox  Roberts, 1973
Ptychocharax
Ptychocharax rhyacophila  Weitzman, Fink, Machado-Allison & Royero L., 1994 
Scopaeocharax
Scopaeocharax atopodus  (Böhlke, 1958)
Scopaeocharax rhinodus  (Böhlke, 1958)
Tyttocharax
Tyttocharax cochui  (Ladiges, 1950)
Tyttocharax madeirae  Fowler, 1913
Tyttocharax tambopatensis  Weitzman & Ortega, 1995
Xenurobrycon
Xenurobrycon coracoralinae  Moreira, 2005
Xenurobrycon heterodon  Weitzman & Fink, 1985
Xenurobrycon macropus  Myers & Miranda-Ribeiro, 1945
Xenurobrycon polyancistrus  Weitzman, 1987
Xenurobrycon pteropus  Weitzman & Fink, 1985

References

Fish of South America
Characidae
Fish subfamilies